Stella is a 1990 American drama film produced by The Samuel Goldwyn Company and released by Touchstone Pictures. The screenplay by Robert Getchell is the third feature film adaptation of the 1923 novel Stella Dallas by Olive Higgins Prouty. Previous film versions were Stella Dallas (1937) and the silent film Stella Dallas (1925).

The title character is a vulgar and unfashionable single mother living in Watertown, NY, who, determined to give her daughter Jenny all the opportunities she never had, ultimately makes a selfless sacrifice to ensure her happiness.  This film version differs from earlier versions in that Stella never marries the father of her child, and in fact, declines his proposal early in the film.

John Erman directed a cast that included Bette Midler as Stella and Trini Alvarado as Jenny, with John Goodman, Stephen Collins, Marsha Mason, Eileen Brennan, Linda Hart, Ben Stiller, and William McNamara in supporting roles.

Plot
Stella (Bette Midler) is a feisty woman working in a bar when she meets and falls for the suave charms of the young Dr. Stephen Dallas (Stephen Collins). Although from opposite ends of the social spectrum, they start an affair resulting in Stella becoming pregnant. After he proposes half-heartedly, she rejects him and embarks upon raising their child Jenny as a single mother but is always helped and encouraged by her stalwart friend, a local good natured barfly, Ed Munn (John Goodman). Stella is fiercely independent and proud and is determined to do well by this child and take on whatever jobs she must to raise her daughter properly. When Jenny is 4 years old, her father suddenly reappears on the scene and is determined to get to know his daughter. At first reluctant to allow this, Stella is persuaded to allow contact, and a happy bond develops between the father and daughter. As Jenny (Trini Alvarado) grows up, she becomes torn between her father's rich and well-connected background, and her loyalty and love for her mother who is poor and free spirited, yet devoted to her daughter. She also despises the perceived relationship she sees developing between Stella and Ed Munn who is now a broken alcoholic. Jenny eventually meets and falls for a boy from her fathers 'world' and Stella realizes that now, the disparities in her own and Jennys father's backgrounds might jeopardize her daughter's future happiness.

Cast
Bette Midler as Stella Claire
John Goodman as Ed Munn
Trini Alvarado as Jenny Claire
Ashley Peldon as Jenny (age 3)	
Alisan Porter as Jenny (age 8)
Stephen Collins as Stephen Dallas
Marsha Mason as Janice Morrison
Eileen Brennan as Mrs. Wilkerson
Linda Hart as Debbie Whitman 
Ben Stiller as Jim Uptegrove 
William McNamara as Pat Robbins

Reception

The film received mediocre reviews. Peter Rainer quipped in his Los Angeles Times review, "Do we really need to be put through another version of 'Stella Dallas'? Is this the vehicle that Bette Midler thinks will reclaim her serious-actress status? If so, she's greatly misunderstood her gifts, which stand in raucous, subversive contrast to everything this sudsy weepie represents. Directed by John Erman, freighted with a musical score of soaring banality, this 20-year saga of an uneducated, working-class single mother who sacrifices everything to give her daughter the chance she never had is so recklessly shameless it verges on camp parody." In The Washington Post, critic Rita Kempley stated: "From bathhouse chanteuse to Lemon Joy diva, from self-proclaimed queen of camp, sass and tactlessness to goddess of suds, sap and pap -- yes, you have come a long way, Baby Divine. Gone is the Bette Midler of "Clams on the Half Shell" and 'Ruthless People,' the better Midler, and in her place is this new middling piddler." In her New York Times review, Janet Maslin said, "Bette Midler, too old for the film's opening and too smart for its resolution, isn't exactly the right actress, but she's a lot closer than might have been expected. Ms. Midler manages to gloss over the story's inconsistencies, play up its charming aspects, and generally bluster her way through . . . her exuberance is most helpful in overshadowing the inconvenient aspects of this story." A far more positive review came from critic Roger Ebert who wrote that "Stella is the kind of movie that works you over and leaves you feeling good, unless you absolutely steel yourself against it. Go to sneer. Stay to weep."

Razzie Award nominations went to Midler for Worst Actress and Jay Gruska and Paul Gordon for Worst Original Song ("One More Cheer").

Box office
Stella debuted at No. 2 in Canada and the United States behind Driving Miss Daisy. Total US gross for the film was $20,240,128.

Home media
The film was issued on VHS on Touchstone Home Video (Cat. #995) on August 29, 1990, and proved more successful on home video. Stella was released on DVD on April 8, 2003. The film was presented in Widescreen format, no special features were included.

References

External links
 
 
 
 
 
 
 New York Times review

1990 films
1990 drama films
American drama films
Remakes of American films
Films about social class
Films based on American novels
Films directed by John Erman
Films scored by John Morris
Films set in New York (state)
Films shot in Florida
Films shot in New York City
Films shot in Toronto
The Samuel Goldwyn Company films
Touchstone Pictures films
Films about mother–daughter relationships
1990s English-language films
1990s American films
Films with screenplays by Robert Getchell